The Magnificent Kick (also known as Secret Kick of Death in the U.K) is a 1980 Hong Kong martial arts biography film. The film is a flashback story of the life of Wong Fei Hung, the Chinese martial arts master and folk hero of Cantonese ethnicity, and is named after his trademark move- a kick too fast to be countered, known as 'the shadowless kick'. The director is Daniel Lau Tan-Ching, and the producer is Ng Why. The film stars Kwan Tak-hing, Jason Pai-piao, Cecilla Wong Hang-sau and Han Ying-chieh. The production company is Friendship Films (H.K.) Co, Hsu Tang is the production manager, the screenplay is by Sze-To On, and the script supervisor is Wong Mei Ling. The martial art used in the film by Kwan Tak-hing is Hung Ga / Hung Gar.

Kwan Tak-hing as Wong Fei Hung
Kwan Tak-hing acted the role of the famous chinese martial artist and physician, Wong Fei Hung (1847-1924), in 77 films, between 1949 and 1981. That is a world record for the portrayal of one character by the same actor in feature films. The first of his portrayals was in the 1949 film The Story of Huang Fei-hung Part 1,  and in 1956 he starred in 25 Fei- hung films. The production of the Fei-hung films ended in 1970, but was revived in 1974 with The Skyhawk, followed by a television series, and then the films Magnificent Butcher in 1979, Magnificent Kick in 1980 and Dreadnaught in 1981.
 By the time he starred in The Magnificent Kick,  Kwan Tak-hing was  75 years of age and a stunt man had to take his place for the most physical scenes.

Cast 

 Kwan Tak-hing as Wong Fei Hung / Wong Feihong
 Jason Pai-piao as Ah Su
 Cecilla Wong Hang-sau 
 Han Ying-chieh
 Nick Cheung Lik
 Chiang Tao
 Lau Hok-Nin
 Alan Chan Kwok
 Ma Chan-San
 Lee Fat-Yuen
 Fung Ging-Man
 Cham Siu-Hung                                           
 Wong Mei                                       
 Sai Gwa-Pau                                           
 Chong Wai                                           
 Ma Kim-Ying                                           
 Tai San                                       
 Chan Ling-Wai                                          
 Ma Hon-Yuen                                           
 Chan Leung                                     
 Lai Kim-Hung                               
 Ho Bo-Sing

References

See also 
 Cinema of Hong Kong

1980 films
Hong Kong martial arts films
1980s Hong Kong films